The Friedehorst Park, also called the Lehnhof Park, is a green space in the Bremen borough of  on the border of states of Bremen and Lower Saxony. It is about 9 ha in area. The park, which is open to the public, belongs to the Evangelical Church of Bremen.

Geography

Location 
Friedehorst Park is in St. Magnus, a suburb of the borough of Burglesum.

Bremen's highest point 
At 32.5 m, the highest natural point in Bremen is an eminence in Friedehorst Park near the northern border of Bremen with Lower Saxony.

The top of the rubbish tip in the parish of Hohweg in the Bremen borough of Walle, is higher, being variously reported as 42 m and 49 m.

Protected area 

History 
The manor house, originally a building in the Swiss chalet style, was built in 1888 and replaced in 1904 by a new one in the Neo-Baroque style, which in turn was demolished in the  1930s. The park was originally larger than it is today, having an area of 16 ha. The  (Friedehorst Foundation) with its buildings is located on the eastern side of the park. To the west of the park the suburb of Lehnhofsiedlung was built in 1950/51.

External links 

 Photograph of the entrance area and of the site at Panoramio

References 

Geography of Bremen (state)
Parks in Germany